is a town located in Saitama Prefecture, Japan. , the town had an estimated population of 30,836 in 13,055 households and a population density of 1100 persons per km².

Geography
Kamisato is located on the extreme northwestern border of Saitama Prefecture, separated from Gunma Prefecture by the Kanna River, and isolated from the remainder of Saitama by the Chichibu Mountains.

Surrounding municipalities
 Saitama Prefecture
 Honjō
 Kamikawa
Gunma Prefecture
 Takasaki
 Fujioka
 Tamamura

Climate
Kamisato has a humid subtropical climate (Köppen Cfa) characterized by warm summers and cool winters with light to no snowfall.  The average annual temperature in Kamisato is 12.6 °C. The average annual rainfall is 1532 mm with September as the wettest month. The temperatures are highest on average in August, at around 24.0 °C, and lowest in January, at around 1.3 °C.

Demographics
Per Japanese census data, the population of Kamisato has recently plateaued after a long period of growth.

History
The area of Kamisato was part of ancient Musashi Province. The villages of Jimbohara, Kami, Shichihongi and Nagahata were created within Kodama District with the establishment of the modern municipalities system on April 1, 1889. Kamisato village was created on May 3, 1954 by the merger of these four villages. Kamisato was elevated to town status on November 3, 1971.

Government
Kamisato has a mayor-council form of government with a directly elected mayor and a unicameral town council of 14 members. Kamisato, together with the city of Honjō and town of Kamikawa, contributes two members to the Saitama Prefectural Assembly. In terms of national politics, the town is part of Saitama 11th district of the lower house of the Diet of Japan.

Economy
Kamisato has a large industrial park in the southeastern corner; however, many people commute to neighboring Takasaki or Fujioka.

Education
Kamisato has five public elementary schools and two public middle schools operated by the town government. The town does not have a high school.

There is also an international school, the Instituto Educacional TS Recreação Brazilian school.

Transportation

Railway
 JR East – Takasaki Line

Highway
  – Kamisato IC

References

External links

Official Website 

Towns in Saitama Prefecture
Kamisato, Saitama